Miss Indonesia 2014 is the 10th edition of the Miss Indonesia pageant. It was held on 17 February 2014 at Hall D2 Jakarta International Expo, Jakarta, Indonesia. Miss World 2013, Megan Young of Philippines attended the awarding night. Vania Larissa as Miss Indonesia 2013 from West Kalimantan crowned her successor, Maria Rahajeng from West Sulawesi. She represented Indonesia in Miss World 2014 in London, England and place in Top 25.

Judges 

 Liliana Tanoesoedibjo, Founder and Chairwoman of Miss Indonesia Organization.
 Ferry Salim, actor and UNICEF National Ambassador for Indonesia.
 Inesh Putri Tjiptadi Chandra, Miss Indonesia 2012.
 Wulan Tilaar Widarto, Vice Chairwoman of Martha Tilaar Group.
 Priyo Oktaviano, fashion designer.

Results

Fast Track Event
Fast track events held during preliminary round and the winners of Fast Track events are automatically qualified to enter the semifinal round. This year's fast track events include: Talent, Sport, Catwalk (Modelling), Beauty With a Purpose, and two new fast track challenge is Nature & Beauty and Multimedia.

Special Award

Audition of Miss Indonesia 2014

Audition Schedule  
 Surabaya: October 20, 2013
 Makassar: October 27, 2013
 Bandung: November 23–24, 2013
 Jakarta: November 10 & December 14–15, 2013

Contestants

Other pageant notes

East Java

Notes
  West Sulawesi won for the first time.

Designations
: Visca Zerlinda Hatiti was 1st runner-up of Puteri Indonesia Bali 2012, where the contest was won by Cok Istri Krisnanda Widani who was also 2nd Runner-up Puteri Indonesia 2013 or Puteri Indonesia Pariwisata 2013
 Jakarta Special Capital Region: Olivia Belle Utomo was won Singing Competition in the High School and first winning English Speech Contest and Indonesia Speech. She was the ambassador of HighEnd Teen Magazine at 2010.
 Gorontalo: Windy Dwi Apsari was Miss Hotrod or Ambassador of XL Axiata company, She also a model.
 West Java: Siti Anida Lestari Qoryatin was a national badminton player who has been in national team for couple of years, she competed in BWF World Junior Championships 2 times in 2008 and 2009 with the result lost in Round 3 in 2008 and Quarter Final in 2009 both in women's singles discipline.
  West Sulawesi: Maria Asteria Sastrayu Rahajeng after being crowned as Miss Indonesia, she criticized the current representation in connection with the contest area. It is said that Maria was not the people of West Sulawesi. She is born in Blora and since childhood, he settled in United States and Bali and had never set foot or has blood of West Sulawesi. Maria initially will represent Bali in the selection of Miss Indonesia. But because there has been a representative of Bali, by the organizers of Miss Indonesia, suggested that Maria represents West Sulawesi alone because there is no representative of West Sulawesi elected, so that she eventually competed representing West Sulawesi province. But, Maria already accepted by the Governor of West Sulawesi as represented contestants.

Crossovers
Contestants who previously competed or will compete at other national beauty pageants:

Puteri Indonesia
2008: : Shinta Alvionita As
2013: : Cezia Greatia Pesurnay (Top 3 Puteri Indonesia Berbakat/Miss Talent)

Putri Pariwisata Indonesia
2012: West Papua : Ellen Rachel Aragay (Top 10 & Putri Pariwisata Photogenic)

GADIS Sampul
2011:  Bangka-Belitung Islands: Olivia Pramaisella (Favorite Contestant choose by audience GADIS Sampul 2011)

GoGirl! Look
2011 : Bangka-Belitung Islands: Olivia Pramaisella (Semifinalist) 
2012 :: Vania Rizky Amanda (TOP 20)
2012 : Gorontalo: Windy Dwi Hapsari (Semifinalist)

Top Model Indonesia YAPMI
2013 : Bengkulu: Reksipesi Zekiazhi

References

External links 
 Official site

2014 beauty pageants
Miss Indonesia